Biomaterials Access Assurance Act of 1998 is a United States federal statute establishing liability exemptions for biomaterial suppliers selling chemical components and raw materials utilized in implantable devices for human recipients. The United States federal legislation sets forth rules limiting litigation costs or unwarranted lawsuits for biomaterial suppliers excluded from the design, production, and testing of implantable devices demonstrated as effective and safe to include adequate product warnings.

The H.R. 872 bill was passed by the 105th United States Congressional session and enacted into law by the 42nd President of the United States Bill Clinton on August 13, 1998.

Provision of the Act
The 1998 Act was compiled as six sections establishing liability rulings for biomaterial elements sold by domestic and international suppliers to healthcare manufacturers located in the continental United States.

21 U.S.C. § 1601 ~ U.S. Congressional findings
21 U.S.C. § 1602 ~ Definitions
21 U.S.C. § 1603 ~ General requirements, applicability, and preemption
21 U.S.C. § 1604 ~ Liability of biomaterials suppliers
21 U.S.C. § 1605 ~ Procedures for dismissal of civil actions against biomaterials suppliers
21 U.S.C. § 1606 ~ Subsequent impleader of dismissed biomaterials supplier

Legislation of 1995
On January 31, 1995, the 104th United States House of Representatives and United States Senate introduced the initial liability exemption legislation for suppliers dealing in biomaterial bulk products.

See also
Biocompatibility
Biomaterial Surface Modifications
Biopolymer
Mechanical properties of biomaterials
Medical Device Regulation Act
Surface modification of biomaterials with proteins

References

External links
 
 
 

Acts of the 105th United States Congress
United States federal health legislation
Health care quality
1998 in the United States
Food and Drug Administration
Regulation of medical devices